Help Needed is a charitable foundation that helps other charities and social projects in Russia. The mission of the foundation is systematic development of charity in the country and change of public attitude towards solving social problems.

The foundation systematically implements projects aimed at interaction and development of all parts of society related to solving social problems. The main goal is to strengthen the nonprofit sector in Russia, so that employees could maintain high professional level; the number of charities and NGOs would be sufficient to address the needs of vulnerable population; and finally, all citizens would be actively involved in solving social problems.

The foundation works as a fund of funds, fundraising for other non-profit organizations, including charitable foundations. While it helps other organizations, it does not provide targeted assistance to beneficiaries. All projects supported by Help Needed are being carefully verified.

History of the foundation 
In 2012 Mitya Aleshkovsky, a photographer for the TASS news agency came to Krymsk for an editorial assignment.

After he led the development of support system that efficiently helped local residents suffered from a terrible flood, Aleshkovsky has decided to leave photojournalism and devote himself entirely to charity. In 2013 Aleshkovskiy and a group of journalists started a charitable program HelpNeeded.ru, which operated under Mosaic of Happiness charitable foundation.

Help Needed charitable foundation was registered on September 1, 2015. The co-founders were Mitya Aleshkovsky, who headed the foundation Board and Anna Semenova, who became the director of the new organization. Previously, Anna Semenova worked for the "Our Children" foundation (2012-2014), "Volunteers for orphans" (2007-2012), and for “Start” (2004-2007). Anna graduated from the Sociology Faculty of Moscow State University. M.V. Lomonosov.

Board of the foundation is the supreme collegiate body with the key function to ensure that the foundation meets the objectives for which it was set up. Operations are overseen by the Board of Trustees. The duties of the Board and the Board of Trustees are determined by the statute of the foundation.

Activities

«Takie dela» 
"Takie dela" web portal was launched on May 25, 2015. The project name comes from the Russian phrase “Такие дела” which means something like “so it goes”. The main goal of the project was to use high-quality journalism as a powerful tool for systematic resolving of social problems in Russia. By and large, the portal put the average man back into the agenda of modern media, rediscovering traditions of social journalism and creating new media approach - the fundraising text. Every day the portal posts fundraising articles about the wards of charitable projects, which it supports. At the end of such materials readers are encouraged to make a regular donation of any amount to help the particular project.
To provide the full transparency, all fundraising results, budgets of supported project which are verified by the Help Needed experts, as well as own reports of the foundation are published online and publicly available.
In addition to fundraising articles, the portal publishes editorial materials. Andrei Loshak and Pavel Pryanikov were editors-in-chief in 2015-2016. Since 2016 the project is led by Valery Panyushkin. The visual department is headed by Andrei Polikanov, who worked as a photo editor for Time magazine, headed the department of photography in the Russian Reporter magazine and currently serves as a member of jury for the World Press Photo. "Takie dela" received various awards, including the Government media prize in 2017 for "creating a new format of a resource support of charity in Russia", the Sakharov Prize and others.

Special Projects Department 
The special projects department is a part of "Takie dela" web portal focused on the production of new forms of media covering “tough” and unpopular topics.

In March 2017 an animated web documentary titled “There once lived...” was released in honor of the Homeless Day. Interactive online project tells five stories of real people and received several awards of the Great Eight festival (G8).

Special projects team is also accounted for "The best digital news story" Prize of the international festival Visa pour l'Image given to "Kosa and Kamen" (Warm Waters in English). Project created in collaboration with photographer Vlad Sokhin is devoted to climate change at the Russian Far east.

Sluchaem.ru - taking the opportunity 
In December 2016, Help Needed launched an online platform, Sluchaem.ru (literally “Taking the opportunity"), aimed at involving broader audience into fundraising for charity projects. The service allows anyone to raise funds for non-profit projects using any occasion like birthday, anniversary, sport event or anything else. Users can create pages for their events and take this opportunity to invite their friends, colleagues and subscribers to raise funds for the projects they support.

Research 
Study of the non-profit sector in Russia is one of the key activities of the foundation. Researchers of the foundation systematically collect, analyze and evaluate data on the sector. All research materials are publicly available on the foundation website.

Charitable tours 
At the end of 2017, Help Needed won the Russian Presidential grant to implement the Charity Tours program in far east regions of the country. The ultimate goal of the program is to develop Russian civic society through combining efforts of regional NGOs and media, local authorities and business stakeholders. At the local level the project’s goal is to enhance professional skills of regional non-profit organizations.

Publishing house 
In 2017, the foundation opened its own publishing house to print books on charity, philanthropy and various aspects of development of non-profit sector of the economy. According to the foundation’s Board chairman, Mitya Aleshkovskiy, it is a logical and very important step for the foundation to regularly publish books which are essential for everyone involved in solving social problems. The first book issued by the house was Russian edition of global bestseller by American writer, entrepreneur and activist Dan Pallotta, Uncharitable – How Restraints on Nonprofits Undermine Their Potential.

Links 
 Official site of "Help needed"
 Facebook page "Help needed"
 VKontakte page "Help needed"
 Web portal "Takie dela"
 YouTube-channel of web portal "Takie dela"
 Facebook page "Takie dela"
 VKontakte page "Takie dela"
 Interactive film of "Help needed" and portal "Takie dela" "Vse slozhno"

Publications about project 
 В помощи людям можно соединить даже страшных врагов, Novayagazeta.ru, 29 August 2012
 «Мы хотим находить проблему, о ней писать и доводить её решение до конца», Big City, 4 September 2012
 Российские журналисты запустили волонтерский проект «Нужна помощь», Lenta.ru, 10 September 2012
 Журналисты запустили благотворительный медиафонд «Нужна помощь», The Village, 10 September 2012
 Российские журналисты запускают волонтерский проект «Нужна помощь», Slon.ru, 10 September 2012
 Митя Алешковский: «Если „социальным героям“ не приходит помощь от государства, то она должна прийти от нас», Agency of Social Information, 12 September 2012
 «Мы не хотим с государством ни спорить, ни воевать». Фотограф Митя Алешковский о проекте «Нужна помощь», Afisha, 18 September 2012
 In Russia, volunteers step up, The Washington Post, 3 February 2013
 Митя Алешковский о волонтерском проекте «Нужна помощь», Moscow 24, 29 March 2013
 Митя Алешковский о московских волонтерах и сотрудничестве с государством, Afisha, 22 October 2013
 Митя Алешковский: «ПОЛИТИКА РАЗЪЕДИНЯЕТ ЛЮДЕЙ, А ДОБРО — ОБЪЕДИНЯЕТ», Triboona.ry, 28 January 2014
 Mitya Aleshkovskiy, GOOD magazine, by STACY GUERASEVA
 «У нас нет „крыши“» Интервью Андрея Лошака — о том, зачем благотворительному фонду свое издание, Meduza, 25 May 2015
 «Как в зажиревшее ухо втиснуть им тихое слово»: Лошак о проекте «Такие дела», Afisha, 25 May 2015
 Благотворительный фонд «Нужна помощь» запускает интернет-СМИ «Такие дела», The Village, 25 May 2015
 Ассоциация фандрайзеров вручила первую премию за фандрайзинг «Золотой кот», Agency of Social Information, 5 December 2016
 «Вера», «Такие дела» и «Благосфера»: самые успешные проекты года, Philanthropy, 29 December 2016
 Ссылка дня: Медиапроект «жили|были» о бездомных людях, Monderzine, 27 March 2017
 Фонд "Нужна помощь" и портал "Такие дела" объявляют последний понедельник марта Днём бездомного человека, Hlebnasushny.ru, 21 April 2017
 Благотворительный фонд «Нужна помощь» собрал уже более 300 миллионов рублей в поддержку 70 фондов, Philanthropy, 20 Jule 2017
 «Все сложно» — так называется первый в России интерактивный сериал о жизни с ВИЧ-инфекцией, Novayagazeta.ru, 18 August 2017
 «Лентач» и «Такие дела» запустили реалити-шоу про освоение гектара на Дальнем Востоке, Paperpaper, 1 November 2017
 Фонд создаст «Базу знаний» вместе с организацией «Нужна помощь», Fondpotanin.ru, 24 December 2017
 Фонд "Нужна помощь" запустил сбор на оборудование для реабилитации пожилых пациентов, Otr-online, 26 December 2017
 «Все сложно»: фонд «Нужна помощь» снял интерактивный фильм о жизни с ВИЧ-инфекцией, Tvrain, 23 January 2018
 In former Soviet states, a new tech‑savvy resistance is stirring, The Guardian, 9 January 2019

References 

Charities based in Russia